Inkerman is a locality in South Australia beside Port Wakefield Road between Port Wakefield and Dublin. The town is named for the Hundred of Inkerman, the cadastral unit at the centre of which the town lies. The hundred was named in 1856 by proclamation of Governor Richard MacDonnell after the Crimean War Battle of Inkerman.

References

Towns in South Australia